Europrotomus is an extinct genus of fossil sea snails, true conches, marine gastropod mollusks in the family Strombidae, the true conchs.

Species
Species within the genus Europrotomus include:
†Europrotomus schroeckingeri (Hörnes in Hörnes & Auinger, 1884)
This genus was described by Gijs C. Kronenberg and Mathias Harzhauser in 2012 especially for the fossil species previously known as Strombus schroeckingeri. That species existed during the Miocene in what is now  Austria, Bosnia and Herzegovina, Bulgaria, Hungary and Romania.

References

Strombidae
Fossil taxa described in 2011